Dream of Light (lit. "The Sun of the Quince"), also known as The Quince Tree Sun, is a 1992 Spanish narrative/documentary film directed by Victor Erice. The film centers on Spanish painter Antonio López García  and his attempt to paint the eponymous quince tree. López struggles to capture a perfect, fleeting moment of beauty on canvas, and the film meticulously chronicles his work.

Synopsis
The film begins by showing Antonio López García as a very meticulous painter. He drives in pegs to mark his stance, hangs a weight and uses strings to determine the symmetry and center of his painting. His first attempt starts out peacefully but he soon encounters problems due to the weather and the size of his canvas. As López and a friend discuss Michelangelo's The Last Judgement, painted when Michelangelo was in his 60s, which López is fast approaching, the film's subject takes shape as the relationship between the artist's work and his own mortality. López's future attempts are much more rushed and frantic as he struggles to compete with the weather, the fleeting sun and the rotting and weighed down fruit in maintaining his vision.

Participants
Antonio López García
María Moreno
Enrique Gran
María López
Carmen López
Elisa Ruiz
José Carretero
Amalia Aria
Lucio Muñoz
Esperanza Parada
Julio López Hernández
Fan Xiao Ming
Yan Sheng Dong
Janusz Pietrzkiak
Marek Domagala

Reception
Janet Maslin wrote that "the purity and breadth of this meticulous study are all the more gratifying in view of its unprepossessing style."

Awards
At the 1992 Cannes Film Festival the film won the Jury Prize and the FIPRESCI Prize.

References

External links 
 
 

1992 films
1990s Spanish-language films
Spanish documentary films
Films directed by Víctor Erice
1992 documentary films
Documentary films about painters
1990s Spanish films